Dudleya linearis is an insular succulent plant known by common name as the San Benitos Liveforever. It is endemic to the San Benito Islands, a small group of Mexican islands in the Pacific Ocean, west of Cedros Island. The population was almost wiped out by rabbits introduced to the island.

Description

Morphology 
Dudleya linearis possesses a thick and fleshy caudex, crowned on top by a rosette of tightly packed leaves. The leaves are light green and broadly linear, acuminate and 3 to 7.5 cm long, 6 to 9 mm thick. Bracteate flowering stems 1 to 1.5 cm long emerge from the plant, bearing a glaucous inflorescence consisting of 2 or 3 secund racemes. The flowers are suspended by pedicels that are up to 4 mm long. The calyx of the flower is segmented into 5 sepals, which are ovate-lanceolate, acute, and about 5 mm long. The corolla is a greenish-yellow, 8 to 9 mm long, with its tube shorter than the calyx.

Taxonomy

Taxonomic history 
Dudleya linearis was discovered by a Lieutenant Pond, and described by Edward Lee Greene in 1889 as Cotyledon linearis. Nathaniel L. Britton & Joseph N. Rose of the New York Botanical Garden later classified the plant as Dudleya linearis.

Distribution and habitat 
Dudleya linearis is endemic to West Benito Island, in the San Benito Islands, an archipelago west of Cedros Island.

Conservation 
The San Benito Islands are otherwise uninhabited except for the seldom few fishermen who may camp overnight. There are two manmade structures on the island, a small lighthouse tower in the south, and a large lighthouse on the northwest end. In 1991, rabbits were brought to island, possibly by the lighthouse keeper or fishermen. The rabbits devastated the population of D. linearis, nearly to the point of extirpation, until in 1998, when a hunter with a Jack Russel Terrier known as "Freckles" was hired to eliminate the rabbits. The elimination of the rabbits, along with an El Niño year, lead to the rebound of the D. linearis population.

References 

linearis
Flora of Mexico
Flora of Baja California
Natural history of Baja California
Taxa named by Joseph Nelson Rose
Taxa named by Nathaniel Lord Britton
Taxa named by Edward Lee Greene